Mauro Finetto (born 10 May 1985 in Tregnago, Verona), is an Italian former professional cyclist, who competed as a professional from 2008 to 2022. He rode for UCI ProTour team  in 2011.

Major results

2003
 National Junior Road Championships
2nd Road race
2nd Time trial
2004
 4th Trofeo Città di Brescia
2006
 4th Ruota d'Oro
2007
 2nd Overall Giro della Valle d'Aosta
 2nd Gran Premio della Liberazione
 3rd Road race, National Under-23 Road Championships
2008
 3rd Trofeo Melinda
 3rd Tre Valli Varesine
 3rd Coppa Placci
 4th Coppa Sabatini
 5th Memorial Cimurri
 6th Giro di Lombardia
 8th Giro del Lazio
 9th Giro della Romagna
2009
 1st Hel van het Mergelland
 5th Giro del Friuli
 6th Overall Tour of Turkey
1st Stages 1 & 6
 7th Coppa Bernocchi
 10th Overall Three Days of De Panne
2010
 1st Stage 1b (TTT) Settimana Internazionale di Coppi e Bartali
 5th Giro del Piemonte
 6th GP Miguel Induráin
 6th Klasika Primavera
 10th Tre Valli Varesine
2011
 3rd GP Industria & Artigianato di Larciano
 8th Coppa Bernocchi
 9th Gran Premio dell'Insubria-Lugano
 9th Gran Premio di Lugano
2013
 5th Trofeo Matteotti
 5th Coppa Sabatini
 7th Milano–Torino
 7th Giro dell'Emilia
 8th Gran Premio della Costa Etruschi
 9th Overall Settimana Ciclistica Lombarda
2014
 1st  Overall Tour du Limousin
1st Stage 3
 1st Gran Premio di Lugano
 2nd Gran Premio della Costa Etruschi
 2nd Coppa Sabatini
 3rd Volta Limburg Classic
 6th Tre Valli Varesine
 7th Overall Three Days of De Panne
 8th Gran Premio Nobili Rubinetterie
 9th Gran Premio Città di Camaiore
 9th Gran Premio Industria e Commercio di Prato
 10th Roma Maxima
 10th Milano–Torino
2015
 1st  Overall Cycling Tour of Sibiu
1st  Points classification
1st  Mountains classification
1st Stage 2
 2nd Coppa Bernocchi
 3rd Coppa Sabatini
 4th Overall Tour of Slovenia
1st  Mountains classification
 8th Giro dell'Emilia
2016
 1st  Overall Okolo Slovenska
1st Stage 2
 2nd Overall Settimana Internazionale di Coppi e Bartali
1st  Points classification
 2nd Tour of Almaty
 3rd Giro dell'Appennino
 4th Overall Tour du Maroc
 8th Overall Istrian Spring Trophy
 8th GP Industria & Artigianato di Larciano
 9th Trofeo Matteotti
 10th Overall Presidential Tour of Turkey
2017
 1st Classic Sud-Ardèche
 3rd Trofeo Laigueglia
 6th Overall Tour du Haut Var
 6th Overall Four Days of Dunkirk
 7th Grand Prix d'Ouverture La Marseillaise
 8th Overall Tour du Limousin
 9th Overall Route du Sud
 9th Coppa Ugo Agostoni
 10th Tour du Jura
2018
 5th GP Industria & Artigianato di Larciano
 6th Overall Tour du Haut Var
 8th Giro della Toscana
 9th Overall Tour of Turkey
 9th Tro-Bro Léon
 10th Overall Tour de Luxembourg
1st  Mountains classification
 10th Paris–Chauny
2019
 1st Stage 5 Settimana Internazionale di Coppi e Bartali
 8th Overall Giro di Sicilia
 9th Overall Tour of Turkey
2020
 7th Trofeo Matteotti
 8th Circuito de Getxo
 9th Overall Settimana Internazionale di Coppi e Bartali

Grand Tour general classification results timeline

References

External links
  Profile on lequipe.fr
 

Italian male cyclists
1985 births
Living people
Cyclists from the Province of Verona
Presidential Cycling Tour of Turkey stage winners